Perlodes is a genus of insects belonging to the family Perlodidae.

The species of this genus are found in Eurasia.

Species:
 Perlodes dispar (Rambur, 1842)
 Perlodes floridus Kovács, Tibor & Vinçon, 2012

References

Perlodidae
Plecoptera genera